The second season of American reality competition television series World of Dance premiered May 29, 2018, on NBC. Jennifer Lopez, Ne-Yo, and Derek Hough returned as the judges. Jenna Dewan also returned as the host for her second and final season.

Production
Season 2 was taped between January and March 2018 at Universal Studios Hollywood; about two months before first airing.

Format changes
While the format for season 2 remained relatively unchanged, there were a few slight alterations. Season 2 received a 16-episode order., six more than the ten-episode first season. Additionally, this season, a fourth category, Junior Team, was added for acts under 18 with 5 or more members. The qualifier rounds are cut down from a two minutes to a one-minute routine. The Duels are cut down from two minutes to a ´75 seconds´-routine. The top three highest-scoring acts in The Cut from each division will move on to The Divisional Final, in last season it was just the top two. The Cut, Divisional and World Final rounds are cut down from a two minutes to a '90 seconds'-routine. In The Cut and Divisional Final guest celebrities are assigned as mentors to each division. On World Final there are intermezzo shows. This season by Les Twins, Keone & Mari (actually Mariel) Madrid, Kinjaz and Derek Hough.

Show concept
In preparation for season two, handpicked competitors, being talented in any styles of dancing, from qualifying events around the nation and thousands of online submissions, are divided into four  divisions: 
 Junior (groups of 1–4, under 18), 
 Upper (groups of 1–4, 18 and older), 
 Junior Team (groups of 5+, under 18) and 
 Upper Team (groups of 5+, 18 and older). 
In some cases dancers who didn't apply were directly contacted by the producers or their agents.

The elimination process of the contestants are in four rounds:

 The Qualifiers - The contestants have to qualify with at least 80 points to make it to The Duels.
 The Duels - The contestants choose their opponent starting with the highest scorer from the qualifiers. If the number of contestants in a division is uneven, the last duel will be competed by the three remaining opponents that were unpicked previously. The winner of the duel is the contestant/s with the highest score who then move on to The Cut.
 The Cut - Mentors are assigned to each division to prepare the contestants for their performances. The top three scoring acts in each division move on to Divisional Final.
 Divisional Final - The mentors still support the contestants from each division. A guest judge joins the panel, so there are four judges. The top scoring act in each division will become division champion and move on to the World Final.

In the World Final all four division champions will compete for the US$1,000,000 grand prize. The concept of last season is copied; every contestant will perform twice in two separate rounds. The average score of both rounds by each contestant will make their final score. The contestant(s) with the highest final score will be crowned World of Dance champion 2018 and will win the US$1,000,000 grand prize.

Scoring 
The judges are scoring in 5 categories. Each category is worth 20 points, with a perfect score of 100: 
 Performance (20 points): 
 Effort: How many different elements were put into the routine without overloading or rushing through it. What was the whole effort to dance the performance by the act.
 Personality: How characters and personality put into the performance, in the sense of acting to stimulate emotions by the audience, telling a story or framing pictures.
 Technique  (20 points):
 Transitions: How smooth and elegant the transitions from move to move were without lacking a performance moment.
 Cleanness: How synchronized, ordered by a pattern, precise and committed the movements were within the act.  
 Execution: How flawless the execution of the performance by the act was to the performance song. 
 Choreography  (20 points):
 Difficulty: How difficult it was to perform the figures and movements by the act from judges point of view.
 Musicality: How well pictures, figures and movements were choreographed to the sound and beat of the performance song.
 Tricks: Are unexpected show elements included by properties, clothing or the bodies of the dancers and how well was it done. 
 Creativity  (20 points):
 Originality: How unique, new, fresh and interesting was the performance. 
 Artistic Choices: What styles of dancing were shown and merged. How well was it done regarding basic dance styles and style culture, e.g. costumes, shoes. The performance song and the use of properties are artistic choices as well. How well did they fit to the performance.
 Dynamics: How energizing and powerful the performance was and how much action was on stage.  
 Presentation  (20 points):
 Crowd Appeal: How the crowd around the show stage reacted to the performance.
 Impact: How memorable, influential and worth talking about it later the performance was.

Judges, host and mentors

Jennifer Lopez, Ne-Yo, and Derek Hough returned as the series judges, with Jenna Dewan returning as host. 
Misty Copeland, who guest judged in season 1, came back as guest judge for the Divisional Final, with Julianne Hough, Mel B, Savion Glover and Paula Abdul also joining as guest mentors for The Cut.

Tony Award winner Savion Glover, collaborated with judge Jennifer Lopez with the Junior Team division. Actress, dancer, singer and Emmy Award-winning choreographer Julianne Hough, worked with her brother, judge Derek Hough, in the Upper division. “America’s Got Talent” judge Mel B joined forces with judge Ne-Yo in mentoring the Junior division. World-renowned dancer/choreographer Paula Abdul teamed with host/mentor Jenna Dewan in the Upper Team division
Grammy Award-winning and multi-platinum selling artist Ciara joined as guest mentor during the Divisional Final as well (airing Wednesday, Sept. 5 at 9 p.m. ET/PT).

Three weeks after the season finale host Jenna Dewan publicly announced that she would not return as host for season 3. 
“It has been an absolute thrill to be a part of this incredible, groundbreaking show from the very beginning. I am forever grateful of my NBC family. However I will not be returning to the show as host for season 3.” While she did not return for season 3 as a host, she confirmed she would be returning briefly as a mentor.

Dancers
The acts competing in season 2 were released by People on May 1, 2018, and Bustle. The list of contestants who made it to The Duels is published by NewsWeek, except Elektro Elite and ThaMOST (s.below). The ages for each dance act were made available on the World of Dance website.

Junior (under 18, up to 4 members)

 Ages of Elektro Elite are taken from a personal Q&A video.

Junior Team (under 18, 5-15 members)

Upper (18 and over, up to 4 members)

Upper Team (18 and over, 5-15 members)

 This dance act competed on Season 1 of World of Dance

The Qualifiers

The qualifier round took place between May 29, 2018, and July 24. In each round of the Qualifiers, the dance acts performed a 1-minute routine in front of the judges and a live studio audience. For a dance act to move to the next round, they had to receive an average score of 80 or higher. Karen y Ricardo was the first dance act of the season (and the second in the show's history) to receive a score of 100 from one or more of the judges, setting up an all-time show high score of 99.7 points, until Charity & Andres became the first act in the show's history to receive a perfect score of 100, earning it during The Duels round.

Some average scores are taken from a summary clip from the TV broadcast of part 8.
Elektro Elite has qualified with 80 points and ThaMOST with 84 points, but neither performance was posted as a Digital Exclusive, nor are the acts listed on NBC World of Dance website.

The Duels

In each round of The Duels, two acts in the same division compete for a spot in the next round. In each division, the acts with the top qualifying scores choose their opponents, then both acts perform back-to-back, receiving feedback from the judges. The act with the highest average at the end of the duel moves on to the next round; the other faces immediate elimination.
Charity & Andres earned the first perfect score in the show's run during The Duels.

The Duel Picks
Opponent selection proceeded according to rank within each division, but performances have been arranged to spread the favorites among the episodes, in an effort to keep ratings up across all episodes.

Some average scores are taken from a summary clip from the TV broadcast of part 4.

The Cut

In The Cut, the 30 remaining acts compete for three spots in each of their divisions. As each dance act competes, their final score is displayed on a leaderboard for their division. Once a dance act's score falls out of the top 3, they face immediate elimination. For this round, each of the judges and the host, Jenna Dewan, became mentors for one of the four divisions; They were also joined by four guest mentors: Savion Glover, Julianne Hough, Paula Abdul, and Mel B. Jennifer & Savion worked with the Junior Teams, Derek & Julianne worked with the Upper acts, Jenna & Paula worked with the Upper Teams, and Ne-Yo & Mel B worked with the Junior acts.

Divisional Final
In the Divisional Final, the 3 remaining acts in each division square off, with only one act going to the World Final to represent their division. Same as The Cut, each of the judges and the host, Jenna Dewan, became mentors for one of the four divisions. Jennifer mentored the Upper acts, Derek worked with the Junior Teams, Ne-Yo worked with the Upper Teams, and Jenna worked with the Junior acts. Guest mentor Ciara helped each division in their practice as well. Guest judge Misty Copeland joined the panel for this segment.

World Final
In the World Final, the final 4 division champions competed head to head to win the one million dollar prize. As with the previous 2 rounds, the judges and the host, Jenna, became mentors for each of the finalists. Derek worked with Charity & Andres, Jennifer worked with S-Rank, Jenna worked with Michael Dameski, and Ne-Yo worked with The Lab. Each of the 4 finalists performed twice. The first performance's music was chosen by their judge, or Jenna, and the second was chosen by the finalist. After each performance, the final scores were displayed on a leaderboard. The winner of the World Finals was determined by the judges combined average scores from both performances. After the first four performances, Season 1's Divisional Finalists Kinjaz and Keone & Mari performed with Derek Hough. Season 1's winner Les Twins also performed before the crowning. After the final performances, The Lab were announced as the winners of World of Dance; their final combined score of 97.5 beat out Michael Dameski by 1.5 points.

Final Scores
4th: S-Rank (93.5)

3rd: Charity & Andres (94.3)

2nd: Michael Dameski (96.0)

1st: The Lab (97.5)

Highest Scoring Dances

 Misty Copeland joined the Judges panel for Divisional Final round

Ratings

Contestants who appeared on previous season

 Andres Penate, of Charity & Andres, competed in season 1, as a member of 801Squad.
 Jaxon Willard competed in season 1, as a member of 801Squad.
 Melvin Timtim, of S-Rank, competed in season 1, as a member of Chapkis Dance Family.
 Josh Price, of S-Rank, competed in season 1, as a member of ImmaBEAST.
 The Lab competed in season 1. They added six new members by The Lab to the lineup of last season.
 Sean Lew, of Sean & Kaycee, competed in season 1, as a member of ImmaBEAST.
 Taylor Hatala, of Josh & Taylor, competed in season 1 with her dance partner Kyndall Harris as KynTay.
 Josh Beauchamp, of Josh & Taylor, competed in season 1, as a member of ImmaBEAST.
 Eva Igo, competed in season 1, reached the World Final and finished as runner-up to 'Les Twins'.
 Luka & Jenalyn competed in season 1.
 Royal Flux competed in season 1.
 DNA competed in season 1. 
D'Angelo Castro, of The Untouchables, competed in season 1 with his partner Amanda Carbajales.

References

External links
All full episodes can currently be watched on NBC World of Dance website, but only officially within the United States due to geographical restrictions

2018 American television seasons
Dance competition television shows